The F1 Taksim–Kabataş funicular line is an underground funicular in Istanbul, Turkey. It serves the F1 line of the Istanbul metro, which connects the hubs at Taksim Square and Kabataş, Istanbul.

Overview
The funicular was built by the Doppelmayr Garaventa Group and opened on June 29, 2006, the funicular is operated by Metro İstanbul company, a subsidiary of Istanbul Metropolitan Municipality. The ride on the  line takes 2.5 minutes.  the daily ridership was 30,000 passengers between the operating hours from 6:15 to 0:00, daily number of trips were 195, with a headway of 3 minutes during peak hours.

Stations

See also 
 Istanbul Tünel funicular
 List of funicular railways

References

External links

F1
Railway lines opened in 2006
2006 establishments in Turkey
Rapid transit in Turkey
Standard gauge railways in Turkey
Underground funiculars
Beyoğlu
Funicular railways in Istanbul